Christopher Blagden (born 26 September 1971) is a British former alpine skier who competed in the 1992 Winter Olympics.

References

1971 births
Living people
British male alpine skiers
Olympic alpine skiers of Great Britain
Alpine skiers at the 1992 Winter Olympics